Theodore Abrahamson (June 24, 1900 – October 21, 1978) was a dairy farmer, businessman and politician. He was a Republican member of the Wisconsin State Assembly and Mayor of Tigerton, Wisconsin.

Biography
Abrahamson was born in Lyngdal, Norway, and received his early education in Norway. After immigrating to the United States, he attended evening school and worked as a dairy farmer. He owned two feed elevators and was the founder and owner of a milk house company.

Career
Abrahamson was president of Tigerton, Wisconsin from 1948 to 1964, and was a member of the Shawano County, Wisconsin Board from 1936 to 1939 and from 1956 to 1964. Abrahamson was elected to the State Assembly in 1958 and re-elected in 1960 and 1962. He represented Menominee and Shawano counties.

Personal life
Abrahamson and his wife Sevrina (née Eikaas, 1893–1983) had two sons and a daughter; Lennert Abrahamson, Harvin Abrahamson, and Sylvia Abrahamson. They resided in Tigerton, Wisconsin.

References

People from Lyngdal
Norwegian emigrants to the United States
People from Tigerton, Wisconsin
Republican Party members of the Wisconsin State Assembly
Mayors of places in Wisconsin
1900 births
1978 deaths
20th-century American politicians